The Darien River is a  tidal river in the U.S. state of Georgia, in the vicinity of the city of Darien.  It is part of the large complex of salt marshes surrounding the mouth of the Altamaha River.

See also
List of rivers of Georgia
North River (Darien River)
South River (Darien River)

References 

Rivers of Georgia (U.S. state)
Rivers of McIntosh County, Georgia